Thomas Parker Sloan (born 4 October 1880) was a Scottish footballer who played as a centre half.

Career
Born in Glasgow, Sloan played club football for Third Lanark, where he served as club captain and won the Scottish Football League championship with them in 1904, followed by the Scottish Cup in 1905. He later served as a club director.

Sloan made one appearance for Scotland in 1904.

References

1880 births
Year of death missing
Scottish footballers
Scotland international footballers
Thornliebank F.C. players
Glasgow Perthshire F.C. players
Third Lanark A.C. players
Association football central defenders
Place of death missing
Scottish Football League players
Scottish Junior Football Association players